Chinari may refer to:

Places
 Chinari, Armenia; a village
 Chinari, Azad Kashmir, Pakistan; a village
 Chinari, Khyber Pakhtunkhwa, Pakistan; in Mohmand District
 Chinari, Mureș County, Romania; a village in the commune of Sântana de Mureș

Other uses
 Chinarism, the offshoot of Alevism
 Oberiu or chinari, a Soviet art collective